Market Center is a national historic district in Baltimore, Maryland, United States. It is an approximately 24-block area in downtown Baltimore that includes buildings associated with the development of the area as Baltimore's historic retail district. The area evolved from an early 19th-century neighborhood of urban rowhouses to a premiere shopping district featuring large department stores, grand theaters, and major chain stores. The diverse size, style, scale, and types of structures within the district reflect its residential origins and evolution as a downtown retail center.

It was added to the National Register of Historic Places in 2000.

References

External links
, including photo from 1999, at Maryland Historical Trust
Boundary Map of the Market Center Historic District, Baltimore City, at Maryland Historical Trust
The Market Center Merchants Association

Historic districts on the National Register of Historic Places in Baltimore